Dudley Freightliner Terminal was opened on the site of Dudley railway station in November 1967, as one of Freightliner's first rail terminals. It was an instant financial success and by 1981 was one of the most profitable Freightliner terminals in Britain, but Freightliner announced plans to close it and transfer the staff to the less successful Birmingham terminal. These plans were shelved in 1983 but resurfaced in 1986, with the terminal finally closing in September 1989. Trains continued to pass the site of the Freightliner terminal until the Wednesbury to Round Oak section of the South Staffordshire Line and Oxford, Worcester & Wolverhampton line closed in March 1993.

History
The station platform became the depot platform, but with no buildings save for the odd shed. A concrete strip was built over one of the Tipton Five Ways lines to act as a footing for a large gantry crane that had its other footing on the old platform. The old signal box was at the Blower's Green end of the station and was demolished in 1967 and replaced by a modernized one beside the main road embankment. The sidings near the Castle side embankment were replaced by the manager's office, a staff room and some sheds.

The Freightliner equipment was removed within months of the terminal's closure, and most of the concrete surface was removed later in the 1990s. The adjacent signal box was closed on 5 June 1988 and damaged in an arson attack the following year, being dismantled in the early 1990s.

Today's usage
Plans for a waste reception centre to be developed on the site were unveiled in 1997, but these were quickly shelved. There were later plans for housing and even a new football stadium to be built on the site, but none of these plans ever materialized and the site remained derelict for more than 20 years. In 2014, part of the land was developed for a road link between Dudley Zoo and the Black Country Museum, as well as parking facilities for visitors to these attractions.

West Midlands Metro
A 15-year-long regeneration project will see the station become part of the local tram network with the line reopening between Walsall, Dudley Port railway station, Dudley railway station and the Merry Hill Shopping Centre for trams. Goods trains would continue on past Brettell Lane railway station and on to the mainline at Stourbridge junction, although the trams would only reach Wednesbury to the north and Brierley Hill to the south. The closed section of railway through Dudley is expected to re-open by 2023, as a combined West Midlands Metro tram route, and the capacity for heavy rail line at a later date.

When the Midland Metro opens, the route will involve trams leaving the traditional line near the former terminal site and passing through Dudley town centre before rejoining the line at the southern mouth of the Dudley Railway Tunnel.

Part of the terminal site is already occupied by a new car park serving Dudley Zoo. The site was cleared of vegetation and the old track in 2017, along with other locations along the disused line, with full scale work beginning towards the end of 2019. Several bridges along the route are being completely rebuilt, while Parkhead Viaduct is undergoing renovation rather than reconstruction due to its listed status.

Historic imagery of the site

See also
Round Oak Steel Terminal
Great Bridge North railway station
Wren's Nest quarry

References

External links
Dudley station
http://chasewaterstuff.wordpress.com/2010/08/25/some-south-staffordshire-railway-byways/
localhistory.scit.wlv.ac.uk

Disused railway goods stations in Great Britain
Rail transport in Dudley
Railway freight terminals in the United Kingdom
Transport infrastructure completed in 1967
1967 establishments in England
1989 disestablishments in England
Railway stations in Great Britain opened in the 20th century